Duang Jai Nai Montra is a Thai television drama. It starred Phakin Khamwilaisak, Nuttanicha Dungwattanawanich, Peter Corp Dyrendal, and Kannarun Wongkajornklai. It aired on Channel 3 from January 27, 2021, to March 18, 2021.

Synopsis 
Pachara (Phakin Khamwilaisak) was a former warrior of Tarawapuram, an ancient kingdom over a thousand years ago. He was cursed by his lover named Matira (Nuttanicha Dungwattanawanich). Because of the curse, Pachara could never die and suffers from seeing his loved ones die for over a thousand years. After thousands of years, he meets Praoploy, an artist with heart disease. As soon as he sees Praoploy, he feels that it was the reincarnation of his past love Matira. Is Praoploy really Matira?

Cast

Main 
Phakin Khamwilaisak (Tono) as Pachara Thanapunat Prechmaneewong (President of Phachara Group) 
Nuttanicha Dungwattanawanich (Baifern, Nicha) as Matira / PraoPloy Kamolwichian (Prao) (Playapol's younger sister/Primpak's older sister)
Peter Corp Dyrendal (Peter) as Praipol Kamolwichian (Pol) (Proud Ploy and Prim Face's older brothers)
Kannarun Wongkajornklai (Prang) as Wandara (Wan) / Wasita (Wanda) (Wasan's daughter)
Chaiyapol Julien Poupart (New) as Wipoo Phasanatecho (Poo) (President of V Estress)
Lorena Schuett (Lena) as Primphak Kamolwichian (Prim) (Plaiphon and Proudploy's youngest sisters)

Supporting 
Kanticha Chumma (Ticha) as Karisa Stone (Rollno Ronald's daughter)
Atthama Chiwanitchaphan (Bowie) as Matinee (Nee) (Wiphoo's secretary)
Paweenut Pangnakorn (Pookie) as Somornsri (Morn) (Younger version of Plaiphon) 
Montree Jenuksorn (Pu) as Sindu (Phachara's secretary)
Anant Boonnark (A) as Watson (Wasita's father)
Virakarn Seneetantikul (Maprang) as Orn (Mrs. Aoi's sister)
Janya Thanasawangkul (Ya) as Oi (Mrs. On's sister)
Ramida Prapasanobon (Noon) as Kala (Kalah's daughter/Pachara's servant)
Worapot Fanthamkang (Phukhao) as Nukul (Nu) (Assistant secretary of Dr. Pachara)
Anavil Charttong (Best) as Khem (Pachara's servant)
Surasak Chaiat (Nu) as Krai (Kalah's father/Pachara's servant)

Guest Appearances 
Lapassalan Jiravechsoontornkul (Mild) as Mika (daughter of a Japanese general/Proud Ploy's former life) (Ep.9)
Apinan Prasertwattankul (M) as Field marshal of Imperial Japanese Army (Mika's father) (Ep.9)
Kanokchat Manyaton (Typhoon) as Prince Isara (Half-brother of Prince Phachara and Prince Rutara) (Ep.4,5,6,7,8)
Papangkorn Lerkchaleampote (Beam) as Prince Ruthara (Half-brother of Prince Phachara and Prince Issara) / Charles (Interpol) (Ep.4,5,6,7,8,15,16) 
Marilyn Kate Gardner (Kate) as Ladtha (Proud Ploy's former life) (Ep.2,4,5,6,7,8,11,12,13,14,16)
Pattharapon ToOun (Ron) as Wasudha (Half-brother of Prince Rudra and brother Matira) (Ep.4,5,6,7,8)
Kaliya Niehuns (Lita) as Chantra Sintuthrp (Ep.2,4,5,6,7,8,11,12,13,14,16)
Wayne Falconer (Wayne) as Sunthornresaracha (Father Prince Issara, Prince Pachara and Prince Rudra) (Ep.4,5,6,7,8)
Tanongsak Supakan as Suthichai (Chief Minister Suraya)
Praptpadol Suwanbang (Prap) as Junlaka (Lord of the Tarawapuram Kingdom/Father Chandra) (Ep.4,5,6,7,8) 
Suangsuda Lawanprasert (Namfon) as Suchawadee (Sister of Chancellor Suraya/Mother Vasudha and Prince Rutara) (Ep.4,5,6,7,8)
Paweena Charivsakul (Jeab) as Phimphiman (Prince Isara's mother) (Ep.4,5,6,7)
Narissan Lokavit (New) as Sinthu (Sinthu's past life) (Ep.4,5,8)
Wimonpan Chaleejunghan (Jubjang) as (Prince Pachara's mother) (Ep.4,5,6,7)
Lilly McGrath (Dear) as Poodle (Praipol's friend) (Ep.1,2,9,10) 
Chatchawan Petchvisit (Keng) as Royal Thai Police (Ep.13,14)
Meenay Jutai (Mamameenay) as Wiruthai (Wi Phu's aunt) (Ep.9,11,12)
Tor Techathuwanan as Suriya (The magnate Phachara's worker) (Ep.10,12,13)
Narumon Phongsupan (Koy) as Wipoo's mother (Ep.15)
Chotiros Chayowan (Sobee) as Praipol PraoPloy and Primphak's mother (Ep.12)
Alexander Ty Manoiu (Ty) as Saki (Japanese Soldier/Sinthu's past life) (Ep.9)
Jenifer Robert (Jenny) as Bam (PraoPloy's friend) (Ep.1) 
Rachawat Klipngern (Mix) as Praipol PraoPloy and Primphak's father (Ep.12)
 Siwakorn Wiroaddun as Doctor (Ep.1,10,12,16)
 Saifon Cheechang (Saifon) as Journalist (Ep.1,11,12)
 Setsongpol Kammung (Not) as Board of Directors V Estress (Ep.1)
 Opad Sittipian as Board of Directors V Estress (Ep.1)
 Soontorn Meesri (Jim) as Dr. Sakol (Lecturer from the Fine Arts Department) (Ep.1,2,4,9,11,12)
 Daranphob Suriyawong as Stuntman (Ep.1)
 Ektawan Kumchad as Mayor of Koh Phet City (Ep.1,2)
 Thanakorn Premjindakamol as Royal Thai Police (Ep.3)
 Kittiphon Ketmanee (Poo) as Weera (Wipoo's father) (Ep.3,15) 
 Sunthari Chotipun (Nong) as Wipoo's stepmother (Ep.3)
 Watcharachai Sundarasiri (Ant) as Fortune Teller of the Taravapuram Kingdom (Ep.4,5,7,)
 Malee Thaworn as Villager (Ep.4)
 Panyakorn Sornmayura (Pod) as Royal Thai Police (Ep.5,6,12)
 Kasem Saimoon as Royal Thai Police (Ep.5,6,13,)
 Apisatha Srisupan as Nurse (Ep.8)
 Nawaporn Supingklad as Nurse (Ep.8,9)
 Worathanapoj Tantiviriyangkul as Weepoo (Wipoo's father) (Ep.9)
 Punnapat Maneewan (Bas) as Japanese Soldier (Ep.9)
 as Geena (Bodyguard Karisa) (Ep.10,11,12,13,15)
 as Deelance (Bodyguard Karisa) (Ep.10,11,12,13,15)
 Wanthanee Chana-Chai-Yang-Young as Kun nai (Ep.12)
 Wasan Jadklam as Royal Thai Police (Ep.12)
 Ratthawat Akarapisalwattana as Royal Thai Police (Ep.12,13,14)
 as Praipol (chird) (Ep.12) 
 as PraoPloy (chird) (Ep.12)
 as Prim (chird) (Ep.12)
 Paitoon Songubon (Noom) as Stuntman (Ep.13)
 Wiwat Rattanapitak as Royal Thai Police (Ep.13,14)
 Kreingkai Ounkaew as Royal Thai Police (Ep.13,14)
 Chanon Leidwasuporn as Royal Thai Police (Ep.13)
 Jaruwat Thongboran as Royal Thai Police (Ep.13)
 Somjat Thongpreche as Royal Thai Police (Ep.14)
 as Rollno Ronald Stone (Karisa's father) (Ep.15)
 as Andrew (Interpol) (Ep.15,16) 
 as Metha (Royal Thai Police) (Ep.15,16)

Original Soundtrack

References

External links 
 

2020s Thai television series
2021 Thai television series debuts
2021 Thai television series endings
Thai drama television series
Thai romance television series
Thai television soap operas
Channel 3 (Thailand) original programming
Television series by Broadcast Thai Television